Filippo Ganna (born 25 July 1996) is an Italian track and road cyclist who currently rides for UCI WorldTeam . He is a five-time world champion in the individual pursuit, and has won a total of eight medals at the UCI Track Cycling World Championships. He also won the men's individual time trial at the 2020 and 2021 UCI Road World Championships, four stages in the 2020 Giro d'Italia and two stages in the 2021 Giro d'Italia. He won the gold medal in the team pursuit at the 2020 Summer Olympics held at Tokyo in 2021, setting a new world record.

Career
The son of former Italian Olympic sprint canoer Marco Ganna, Ganna emerged into the scene at the 2016 World Indoor Championships with an uncommon negative splits pursuit style of starting very slowly and falling behind, then winding up the speed in the second half to win. After two years with the team, he joined  ahead of the 2019 season.

Between November 2019 and February 2020, Ganna set a world record for the individual pursuit on three occasions, lowering the mark from over 4 minutes, 5 seconds to a time of 4 minutes, 1.934 seconds at the 2020 UCI Track Cycling World Championships in Berlin.

At the 2020 Summer Olympics held at Tokyo in 2021, together with Simone Consonni, Francesco Lamon and Jonathan Milan, he won the gold medal in the team pursuit. The team set a new world record two times, both in the 3rd battery round against New Zealand and in the final against Denmark, at 3:42.02. Italy had set the new Olympic record in the qualifications, which Denmark had beat in the next race.

Major results

Road

2012
 1st  Time trial, National Cadet Championships
2013
 3rd Time trial, National Junior Championships
2014
 1st  Time trial, National Junior Championships
 1st Chrono des Nations Juniors
 1st Trofeo Emilio Paganessi
 4th Time trial, UCI World Junior Championships
 4th Time trial, UEC European Junior Championships
2015
 1st Chrono Champenois
2016
 1st  Time trial, National Under-23 Championships
 1st Paris–Roubaix Espoirs
 1st GP Laguna
 UEC European Under-23 Championships
2nd  Time trial
6th Road race
 2nd Trofeo Città di San Vendemiano
2017
 9th Time trial, UEC European Championships
2018
 2nd Time trial, National Championships
 2nd Overall Vuelta a San Juan
1st  Young rider classification
2019
 1st  Time trial, National Championships
 1st Stage 1 (ITT) Tour de la Provence
 1st Stage 6 (ITT) BinckBank Tour
 2nd Chrono des Nations
 3rd  Time trial, UCI World Championships
 5th Coppa Sabatini
 6th Time trial, UEC European Championships
2020
 1st  Time trial, UCI World Championships
 1st  Time trial, National Championships
 Giro d'Italia
1st Stages 1 (ITT), 5, 14 (ITT) & 21 (ITT)
Held  &  after Stages 1–2
Held  after Stage 1
Held  after Stages 5–8
 1st Stage 8 (ITT) Tirreno–Adriatico
 2nd Overall Vuelta a San Juan
2021
 UCI World Championships
1st  Time trial
3rd  Team relay
 UEC European Championships
1st  Team relay
2nd  Time trial
 Giro d'Italia
 1st Stages 1 (ITT) & 21 (ITT)
Held  &  after Stages 1–3
Held  after Stage 1
 Étoile de Bessèges
1st Stages 4 & 5 (ITT) 
 1st Stage 2 (ITT) UAE Tour
 4th Time trial, National Championships
 5th Time trial, Olympic Games
2022
 1st  Time trial, National Championships
 1st Stage 1 (ITT) Tirreno–Adriatico
 1st Stage 4 (ITT) Critérium du Dauphiné
 1st Stage 5 (ITT) Étoile de Bessèges
 1st Prologue Deutschland Tour
 1st Prologue Tour de la Provence
 UCI World Championships
2nd  Team relay
7th Time trial
 3rd  Time trial, UEC European Championships
2023
 1st Stage 1 (ITT) Tirreno–Adriatico
 2nd Milan–San Remo
 2nd Overall Volta ao Algarve
 2nd Overall Vuelta a San Juan

Grand Tour general classification results timeline

Monuments results timeline

Major championships results timeline

Track

2014
 1st  Individual pursuit, National Junior Championships
2015
 1st  Individual pursuit, National Championships
2016
 1st  Individual pursuit, UCI World Championships
 UEC European Under-23 Championships
1st  Individual pursuit
2nd  Team pursuit
 UEC European Championships
2nd  Individual pursuit
2nd  Team pursuit
2017
 UEC European Championships
1st  Individual pursuit
2nd  Team pursuit
 1st Team pursuit, UCI World Cup, Pruszków
 UCI World Championships
2nd  Individual pursuit
3rd  Team pursuit
2018
 UCI World Championships
1st  Individual pursuit
3rd  Team pursuit
 1st  Team pursuit, UEC European Championships
2019
 1st  Individual pursuit, UCI World Championships
 1st Team pursuit, UCI World Cup, Hong Kong
 2nd  Team pursuit, UEC European Championships
2020
 UCI World Championships
1st  Individual pursuit
3rd  Team pursuit
2021
 1st  Team pursuit, Olympic Games
 UCI World Championships
1st  Team pursuit
3rd  Individual pursuit 
2022 
 Hour record: 56.792 km
 UCI World Championships
1st  Individual pursuit
2nd  Team pursuit
2023
 1st  Team pursuit, UEC European Championships

World records

References

External links

 

1996 births
Living people
Italian male cyclists
UCI Track Cycling World Champions (men)
Cyclists from Piedmont
People from Verbania
Olympic cyclists of Italy
Olympic gold medalists for Italy
Olympic medalists in cycling
Cyclists at the 2016 Summer Olympics
Cyclists at the 2020 Summer Olympics
Medalists at the 2020 Summer Olympics
Italian track cyclists
European Championships (multi-sport event) gold medalists
Italian Giro d'Italia stage winners
Sportspeople from the Province of Verbano-Cusio-Ossola
20th-century Italian people
21st-century Italian people
UCI Road World Champions (elite men)